The Rolaids Relief Man Award was an annual Major League Baseball (MLB) award given from 1976 to 2012 to the top relief pitchers of the regular season, one in the American League (AL) and one in the National League (NL). 

Relief pitchers enter the game after the starting pitcher is removed. The award was sponsored by the antacid brand Rolaids, whose slogan was "R-O-L-A-I-D-S spells relief." Because the first closers were nicknamed "firemen", a reference to "putting out the fire" of another team's rally, the trophy was a gold-plated firefighter's helmet. 

Statistical performance determined the winner, unlike the voting bodies that chose the recipients of the Cy Young Award and the MLB Most Valuable Player (MVP) Award. Each save was worth three points; each win was worth two points; and each loss was worth negative two points. Beginning with the 1988 MLB season, negative two points were given for blown saves. In the 2000 MLB season, Rolaids added an additional point for a "tough save": when a relief pitcher got the save after entering the game with the potential tying run on base. The player with the highest point total won the award.

The first winners were Bill Campbell (AL) and Rawly Eastwick (NL); Campbell also won in the following season. Dan Quisenberry and Mariano Rivera each won the AL award five times, while Rollie Fingers and Bruce Sutter won the award four times each. Lee Smith won the award on three occasions; Campbell, Dennis Eckersley, Dave Righetti, John Franco, Éric Gagné, Randy Myers, Trevor Hoffman, Francisco Rodríguez, Heath Bell, and José Valverde each won the award twice. Sutter (NL 1979), Fingers (AL 1981), Steve Bedrosian (NL 1987), Mark Davis (NL 1989), Eckersley (AL 1992), and Éric Gagné (NL 2003) won the Relief Man and the Cy Young Award in the same season; Fingers and Eckersley won the AL MVP as well, in 1981 and 1992 respectively. Todd Worrell won both the Relief Man and the MLB Rookie of the Year Award in the 1986 MLB season. Rivera and Joe Nathan were the only relief pitchers to have tied in points for the award, and both received the award in 2009. Goose Gossage, Fingers, Eckersley, Hoffman, Rivera, Smith, John Smoltz and Sutter were elected to the Baseball Hall of Fame. Craig Kimbrel (NL) and Jim Johnson (AL) were the final award winners in 2012.

In 2013, Sanofi acquired Rolaids from Johnson & Johnson unit McNeil Consumer Healthcare and cancelled the award.

Winners

National League (1976–2012)

American League (1976–2012)

Notes
 Won Cy Young Award and MLB Most Valuable Player Award in the same season.
 Won Cy Young Award in the same season.
 Won MLB Rookie of the Year Award in the same season.

See also

Major League Baseball Reliever of the Year Award (2014–present; one in each league)
Major League Baseball Delivery Man of the Year Award (2005–2013; one for all of MLB)
Sporting News Relief Pitcher of the Year Award) (2013–present; one in each league)
Sporting News Reliever of the Year Award (1960–2010; one in each league)
Baseball awards
List of MLB awards

References
General

Specific

External links
Relief Man Award at MLB.com
Relief Man Award at Baseball Almanac

Major League Baseball trophies and awards

Awards established in 1976
Awards disestablished in 2013